Lion's Roar (previously Shambhala Sun) is an independent, bimonthly magazine (in print and online) that offers a nonsectarian view of "Buddhism, Culture, Meditation, and Life". Presented are teachings from the Buddhist and other contemplative traditions, with an emphasis on applying the principles of mindfulness and awareness practices to everyday life.

History and profile
Launched by Chögyam Trungpa Rinpoche as an internal publication of the Shambhala community, the Sun has evolved from a community newspaper, the Vajradhatu Sun founded 1978, to a small young magazine, to the largest-circulation Buddhist magazine in the English language.

Established in 1995, the magazine is now a publication of the independent, nonprofit Lion's Roar Foundation.

In 2002, the Sun launched another periodical, Buddhadharma: Practitioner's Quarterly focused strongly on Buddhist practice. Buddhadharma is currently published by the Lion's Roar Foundation. 

In 2003, the Shambhala Sun was the most successful Canadian magazine in the United States.

In November 2015 the magazine's name was changed to Lion’s Roar.

Distributed internationally, the magazine is based and published in Halifax, Nova Scotia, Canada.

Lion's Roar has a circulation of 80,000 copies, with a readership of several hundred thousand.

The Lion's Roar online archive includes a substantial amount of previously published articles and essays free to the public.

In handing out their Alternative Press Awards in 2007, Utne Reader magazine awarded Shambhala Sun for a fourth time, this year for Best Spiritual Coverage. Utne had this to say about the Shambhala Sun:

Notable contributors 

Pema Chodron
The Dalai Lama
Allen Ginsberg
Daniel Goleman
bell hooks
Pico Iyer
Amanda Palmer
Sakyong Mipham Rinpoche
Gary Snyder
Chögyam Trungpa Rinpoche
Robert Thurman
Alice Walker
Jon Kabat-Zinn

Masthead 

Editor-in-Chief: Melvin McLeod 
Publisher: Ben Moore

Awards and critical reception 
Recent awards include:
Utne Reader magazine's Alternative Press award for General Excellence and Spiritual Coverage in 1997, 1998, 1999, 2000 and 2007
Folio magazine’s 2002 Ozzie award for page design
The 2003 Canadian Newsstand Award for cover design
The 2005 and 2007 Atlantic Journalism Award for The Atlantic Best Cover and Best Article.
In 2005, Shambhala Sun ranked number 29 in the Chicago Tribunes ranking of the 50 best magazines in publication. 

Shambhala Sun has received generally positive reviews for its application of Buddhist wisdom to a variety of contemporary topics including the arts, politics, and health. In 1995, Morris Wolfe of The Globe and Mail wrote that "at its best, Shambahala Sun demonstrates how important, and yet how difficult it is to live in the moment, to see and experience what is in front of us". In 1997, Antonia Zerbisias described the magazine as "thoughtful" and "startlingly original" in a review for the Toronto Star. In 2008, the New York Review of Magazines described the magazine's layout as "elegant, spacious and calming" and the editorial content as "effective".

See also
Buddhism in the United States
Tricycle: The Buddhist Review
Buddhadharma: The Practitioner's Quarterly

References

External links 
 Lion's Roar web site

Buddhist magazines
Shambhala vision
Religious magazines published in Canada
Magazines published in Nova Scotia
Bi-monthly magazines published in Canada
Online magazines published in Canada
Magazines established in 1995
Magazines about spirituality
1995 establishments in Nova Scotia
Independent magazines
Mass media in Halifax, Nova Scotia